Enes Isufi (born 14 July 2000) is an Albanian professional footballer who plays as a defender for Albanian club KF Tomori on loan from KF Vllaznia Shkodër.

Career statistics

Club

References

2000 births
Living people
Footballers from Shkodër
Albanian footballers
Association football defenders
Albania youth international footballers
KF Vllaznia Shkodër players
KF Skënderbeu Korçë players
Luftëtari Gjirokastër players
Kategoria Superiore players